The directional figure eight (a.k.a. inline figure-eight loop) is a loop knot. It is a knot that can be made on the bight. The loop must only be loaded in the correct direction or the knot may fail. It is useful on a hauling line to create loops that can be used as handholds. It also provides a place to attach a Z-Drag to the line when prusiks are unavailable.

See also
 Alpine butterfly loop for a loop that is easier to remember and can be loaded in either direction.
List of knots

Climbing knots